Rho Lupi, Latinized from ρ Lupi, is a solitary star in the southern constellation of Lupus. It is visible to the naked eye with an apparent visual magnitude of 4.05. Based upon an annual parallax shift of 10.32 mas as seen from Earth, it is located about 316 light years from the Sun. It is a member of the Upper Centaurus–Lupus subgroup of the nearby Scorpius–Centaurus association.

This is a B-type main sequence star with a stellar classification of B3/4 V. It is a microvariable with a period of 10.7 hours and an amplitude of 0.0046 in magnitude. With an age of just 44 million years, the star is spinning with a projected rotational velocity of 166 km/s. This is giving the star an oblate shape with an equatorial bulge that is an estimated 6% larger than the polar radius. It has an estimated 4.66 times the mass of the Sun and about 3.4 times the Sun's radius. It is radiating 365 times the solar luminosity from its outer atmosphere at an effective temperature of 15,947 K.

References

B-type main-sequence stars
Slowly pulsating B stars
Lupus (constellation)
Lupi, Rho
Durchmusterung objects
071536
5453
128345
Upper Centaurus Lupus